Anita Sings the Most is a 1957 album by Anita O'Day.

Recording and music
The album was recorded in Los Angeles on January 31, 1957. In addition to vocalist O'Day, the musicians were pianist Oscar Peterson, guitarist Herb Ellis, bassist Ray Brown, and Milt Holland or John Poole on drums.

Release and reception
Anita Sings the Most was released by Verve Records. Jazz: The Rough Guide identified the album as one that shows O'Day's "rhythmic invention and accuracy". The AllMusic reviewer wrote: "The very brief playing time (just 33 minutes) is unfortunate on this set, but the high quality definitely makes up for the lack of quantity. A gem."

Track listing 
 "'S Wonderful"/"They Can't Take that Away from Me" (George Gershwin, Ira Gershwin)/(G. Gershwin, I. Gershwin) – 2:57
 "Tenderly" (Walter Gross, Jack Lawrence) – 3:20
 "Old Devil Moon" (Yip Harburg, Burton Lane) – 2:53
 "Love Me or Leave Me" (Walter Donaldson, Gus Kahn) – 2:33
 "We'll Be Together Again" (Carl T. Fischer, Frankie Laine) – 3:37
 "Stella by Starlight" (Ned Washington, Victor Young) – 2:05
 "Taking a Chance on Love" (Vernon Duke, Ted Fetter, John Latouche) – 2:23
 "Them There Eyes" (Maceo Pinkard, Doris Tauber, William Tracey) – 2:37
 "I've Got the World on a String" (Harold Arlen, Ted Koehler) – 3:58
 "You Turned the Tables on Me" (Louis Alter, Sidney Mitchell) – 3:41
 "Bewitched, Bothered and Bewildered" (Lorenz Hart, Richard Rodgers) – 3:55

Personnel 
 Anita O'Day – vocals
 Oscar Peterson – piano
 Herb Ellis – guitar
 Ray Brown – double bass
 John Poole – drums
 Milt Holland – drums

References 

1957 albums
Anita O'Day albums
Verve Records albums
Albums produced by Norman Granz
Albums produced by Anita O'Day